The Palm Springs Air Museum (PSAM), is a non-profit educational institution in Palm Springs, Riverside County, California. The Museum's mission is to exhibit, educate and eternalize the role of the World War II combat aircraft and the role the pilots and American citizens had in winning the war. In addition to flying aircraft, related artifacts, artwork, and library sources are used to perpetuate American history. It contains one of the world's largest collections of flying World War II warplanes, many of which were built in Southern California. Many of these aircraft have been used by motion picture companies in movies set during the second world war.

Located on the north-east side of the Palm Springs International Airport, the Air Museum is housed in a new structure that includes three main display hangars, theater, gift shop, ramp and airport access for flight demonstrations and visiting planes, research library, simulator and education center.

An extensive collection of aviation art by Stan Stokes.

History
The museum was founded by Bob Pond and Pete Madison. It opened to the public on 11 November 1996. Originally operating in concert with the Planes of Fame East Museum in Eden Prairie, Minnesota, following the closure of that museum the aircraft were moved to the Palm Springs Air Museum. The museum opened a new hangar, named for Major General Ken Miles, in May 2017.

The museum announced plans to renovate its entrance and add a large classroom in 2022.

Collection

 Aero S-106 1112
 Bell AH-1G Cobra 67-15574
 Bell H-13 Sioux – on loan
 Bell P-63A Kingcobra 42-68864
 Bell UH-1B Iroquois 63-8610
 Boeing-Stearman PT-17 Kaydet 38393
 Boeing VB-17G Flying Fortress 44-85778
 CAC Sabre F-8612/F-8607 – on loan
 Cessna O-2 Skymaster
 Consolidated PBY Catalina 48426
 Convair F-102A Delta Dagger 56-1432 – on loan
 Convair F-106B Delta Dart 57-2509
 Curtiss TP-40N Warhawk 44-7084
 Douglas B-26C Invader 44-35721
 Douglas RC-47 Dakota 035
 Douglas SBD-5 Dauntless 36176 – on loan
 Douglas TA-4J Skyhawk 154649 – on loan
 Erco 415D Ercoupe 4019
 Fairchild C-119G Flying Boxcar 53-8154 – fuselage only
 General Dynamics F-16C Fighting Falcon 163277 – on loan
 Grumman A-6E Intruder 154162 – on loan
 Grumman C-1A Trader 146048
 Grumman F6F-5K Hellcat 94473
 Grumman F7F-3 Tigercat 80412
 Grumman F-14A Tomcat 160898 – on loan
 Grumman FM-2 Wildcat 55627
 Grumman G-58B Gulfhawk D-1262
 Grumman Gulfstream 1 – owned by Walt Disney, on loan from the Disney Archives
 General Motors TBM-3 Avenger 53785
 Lockheed F-104G Starfighter D-8244
 Lockheed F-117 Nighthawk
 Lockheed PV-2 Harpoon 37211
 Lockheed TV-2 126591
 McDonnell Douglas F-4S Phantom II 153851 – on loan
 McDonnell Douglas F/A-18A Hornet 162403 – on loan
 North American TB-25N Mitchell 44-86747
 North American F-100D Super Sabre 3-888
 North American P-51D Mustang 9273
 North American T-6G Texan 49-3402
 North American T-28B Trojan 138203
 Northrop Grumman EA-6B Prowler 163030 – on loan
 Piper J-3 Cub 4594
 Republic F-84F Thunderstreak 51-9531 – on loan
 Republic F-105D Thunderchief 61‐0108 – on loan
 Republic P-47D Thunderbolt 122
 Sikorsky UH-34D Seahorse 154895
 Supermarine Spitfire XIV SG108/RM694
 Vought FG-1D Corsair 92629

References

Further reading
 
  (here for Table of Contents)

External links

 
 Organizational Profile – National Center for Charitable Statistics (Urban Institute)

Aerospace museums in California
Museums in Riverside County, California
Buildings and structures in Palm Springs, California
Military in Riverside County, California
Military and war museums in California
Tourist attractions in Palm Springs, California